Fiji–Tuvalu relations are diplomatic and other relations between Fiji and Tuvalu.

The countries are neighbours in the vast expanse of the Pacific Ocean; Tuvalu lies directly north of Fiji, and they share a maritime border. Tuvalu is by far the smaller, lesser developed and more remote of the two countries, and is therefore dependent on its close relationship with Fiji. The two countries established formal diplomatic relations in 1979, the year after Tuvalu's independence from the United Kingdom. As of 2014, their relations are described by the Fijian government as "warm and friendly".

History
The countries were first linked together as British colonies in the late 19th century, when they both came within the jurisdiction of the British Western Pacific Territories, the administrative centre of which was in Fiji. After the Second World War, Tuvalu's first doctors were trained at the Fiji School of Medicine, while some of the Tuvaluans from the overcrowded atoll of Vaitupu moved permanently to the island of Kioa, in Fiji, where they and their descendants still live. Fiji remains Tuvalu's gateway to the outside world. The only flights to and from Funafuti International Airport are via Suva, on Air Fiji. In addition, Fiji "is by far Tuvalu’s largest source of imports".

When the Commander of Fiji's military, Commodore Voreqe Bainimarama, took power in Fiji in a coup in 2006, Tuvalu did not join countries such as Australia, New Zealand or Samoa in condemning the new regime. Tuvalu remained supportive of Bainimarama's statements that he would restore democracy on his own schedule. Akuila Yabaki, of the Citizens' Constitutional Forum in Fiji, noted that Tuvalu had little choice in the matter, as it was heavily dependent on maintaining good relations with Fiji.

In 2013, Sir Gordon Ward, a British national serving as Chief Justice of Tuvalu, was a denied a visa by the Fijian government to transit via Fiji on his flight to Tuvalu. Ward had previously sat as a judge in Fiji's Court of Appeal, before resigning in protest against the 2006 coup. As there are no flights into Tuvalu other than through Fiji, Tuvalu's Chief Justice was unable to enter Tuvalu. Fiji remained unresponsive to Tuvalu's attempts to resolve the matter, although the incident was said not to have severely affected bilateral relations.

Agreements
In October 2014, the Prime Ministers of Fiji and Tuvalu signed the Fiji-Tuvalu Maritime Boundary Treaty, which establishes the extent of the national areas of jurisdiction between Fiji and Tuvalu as recognized in international law under the 1982 United Nations Convention on the Law of the Sea.

In December 2014,  a technical agreement was signed between Fiji, Tuvalu and France at the Commonwealth Secretariat’s headquarters in London over maritime boundaries. This agreement uses satellite data to pinpoint where the waters of Fiji, Tuvalu and the French territories of Wallis and Futuna meet. The agreement will help the countries to defend their waters from illegal fishing operations and provide clarity over rights to marine natural resources.

Educational cooperation
Fiji continues to provide most of Tuvaluans' higher education and vocational training, through the University of the South Pacific (USP) and the Fiji National University. Tuvalu does not have its own universities. Students attending the USP at its campus in Funafuti, Tuvalu, rather than its main campus in Fiji, "can listen to lectures broadcast from Fiji, use audio and video-conferencing facilities and employ the USPNet system for communication with lecturers and other students".

Diplomatic missions
Tuvalu has only four embassies abroad: its permanent mission to the United Nations in New York, its embassy to the European Union in Brussels, its newly opened embassy to the Republic of China (Taiwan) in Taipei since 2013, and its high commission to Fiji in Suva. Fiji in turn does not maintain any diplomatic presence in Tuvalu, but does have a "roving ambassador" accredited to ten independent Pacific Island states, including Tuvalu.

See also 
 Foreign relations of Fiji
 Foreign relations of Tuvalu

References

 
Bilateral relations of Tuvalu
Tuvalu